Chrysotoxum perplexum is a North American species of syrphid fly in the family Syrphidae.The adults are strong mimics of wasps. 
Larvae of this genera, when known, are aphid predators.

Description
For terminology see
Speight key to genera and glossary

Length  
Head
The face is convex with a prominent tubercule at the lower end of the facial stripe. The vertex and front are black, with the upper part of the front being whitish pollinose. The first joint of the antennae is longer than the second, and the third is slightly longer than the first and second combined. Lastly, the arista is reddish.

Thorax
The scutellum has a broad transverse black band, leaving a narrow yellow margin at the base and apex.

Abdomen
The sides of the first abdominal segment are yellow, and the arcuate bands on the other segments are narrowly interrupted. The arcuate bands on the second and third segments extend to the lateral margin, while the one on the fourth segment is narrowly separated. The posterior margin of the second segment is entirely black, while the yellow posterior marginal band on the third and fourth segments is narrow on the sides and expands in the middle, being widest on the fourth segment. The two elongated spots on the fifth segment are curved, and the central triangle is small, leaving a very broad V-shaped mark.
Wings 
The wing vein R4+5 is clearly dipped into cell r4+5, and the costal margin of the wing is brown.

Legs
The base of the front and middle femora are dark brown.

Distribution
United States Vermont, New Hampshire, New York, Pennsylvania, Maryland, Maine, Virginia, West Virginia.
Canada Quebec, Nova Scotia, New Brunswick, Saskatchewan.

References

Syrphini
Articles created by Qbugbot
Insects described in 1924
Taxa named by Charles Willison Johnson
Diptera of North America
Hoverflies of North America